Roland Diggle (January 1, 1885 – January 13, 1954) was an English-born, American organist and composer who wrote and arranged an enormous number of published pieces, and who served for forty years as organist and choirmaster at St. John's Episcopal Church of Los Angeles, California.

Roland Diggle was born in London England, and he was educated at the Royal College of Music in London.

He moved to the US in 1904 where he became a tireless advocate of organ music.  During his lifetime he wrote or arranged over 500 organ compositions.  He was well known in national and international music circles and his works have been published both in the U.S. and abroad.  He served for forty years as organist and choirmaster at St. John's Episcopal Church of Los Angeles, California, and he presented recitals at both the San Diego and San Francisco World's Fair Expositions.

He died in Los Angeles, California, and is buried at Angelus Rosedale Cemetery.

References
 Brief bio
 Partial list of piano works
 
 

English composers
American composers
Male composers
1885 births
1954 deaths
Academics of the Royal College of Music
American classical organists
American male organists
People from Los Angeles
20th-century organists
American male composers
20th-century American male musicians
Male classical organists